Mucoepidermoid carcinoma (MEC) is the most common type of minor salivary gland malignancy in adults. Mucoepidermoid carcinoma can also be found in other organs, such as bronchi, lacrimal sac, and thyroid gland.

Mucicarmine staining is one stain used by pathologist for detection.

Signs and symptoms
Presents as painless, slow-growing mass that is firm or hard.  Most appear clinically as mixed tumors. Usually occurs at 30–50 years of age. More predilection towards female sex.

Diagnosis

Histology 
This tumor is not encapsulated and is characterized by squamous cells, mucus-secreting cells, and intermediate cells.

Molecular biology 

Mucoepidermoid carcinomas of the salivary and bronchial glands are characterized by a recurrent t(11;19)(q21;p13) chromosomal translocation resulting in a MECT1-MAML2 fusion gene. The CREB-binding domain of the CREB coactivator MECT1 (also known as CRTC1, TORC1 or WAMTP1) is fused to the transactivation domain of the Notch coactivator MAML2.

A possible association with papillomavirus has been reported.

Prognosis 

Generally, there is a good prognosis for low-grade tumors, and a poor prognosis for high-grade tumors, however recent research have found reoccurring low grade tumors also have a poor prognosis.

Treatment

Surgery is the recommended treatment for localised resectable disease.
When the tumour is incompletely resected (positive margins) post-operative radiotherapy gives local control comparable to a complete resection (clear margins).

Sometimes when surgery is not possible due to extent of disease or if a patient is too frail for surgery, or declines surgery, palliative radiotherapy may be helpful. There has been a report of a case where low dose radiotherapy achieve disease response and control for more than 4 years.

In patients with metastatic disease, chemotherapy response tends to be low (27% partial response rate) and short lived.

Epidemiology
Occurs in adults, with peak incidence from 20–40 years of age. A causal link with cytomegalovirus (CMV) has been strongly implicated in a 2011 research.

References

External links 

Salivary gland neoplasia
Cytomegalovirus-associated diseases